The Ochapowace Nation ( ocâpowês) is a Cree First Nation in southern Saskatchewan, Canada.

Reserves

Reserves include:

 Ochapowace 71
 Ochapowace 71-1
 Ochapowace 71-2
 Ochapowace 71-3
 Ochapowace 71-4
 Ochapowace 71-5
 Ochapowace 71-6
 Ochapowace 71-7
 Ochapowace 71-8
 Ochapowace 71-9
 Ochapowace 71-10
 Ochapowace 71-11
 Ochapowace 71-12
 Ochapowace 71-13
 Ochapowace 71-14
 Ochapowace 71-15
 Ochapowace 71-16
 Ochapowace 71-17
 Ochapowace 71-18
 Ochapowace 71-19
 Ochapowace 71-20
 Ochapowace 71-21
 Ochapowace 71-22
 Ochapowace 71-23
 Ochapowace 71-24
 Ochapowace 71-25
 Ochapowace 71-26
 Ochapowace 71-27
 Ochapowace 71-28
 Ochapowace 71-29
 Ochapowace 71-30
 Ochapowace 71-31
 Ochapowace 71-32
 Ochapowace 71-33
 Ochapowace 71-34
 Ochapowace 71-35
 Ochapowace 71-36
 Ochapowace 71-37
 Ochapowace 71-38
 Ochapowace 71-39
 Ochapowace 71-40
 Ochapowace 71-41
 Ochapowace 71-42
 Ochapowace 71-43
 Ochapowace 71-44
 Ochapowace 71-45
 Ochapowace 71-46
 Ochapowace 71-47
 Ochapowace 71-48
 Ochapowace 71-49
 Ochapowace 71-50
 Ochapowace 71-51
 Ochapowace 71-52
 Ochapowace 71-53
 Ochapowace 71-54
 Ochapowace 71-55
 Ochapowace 71-56
 Ochapowace 71-57
 Ochapowace 71-59
 Ochapowace 71-60
 Ochapowace 71-61
 Ochapowace 71-62
 Ochapowace 71-63
 Ochapowace 71-64
 Ochapowace 71-65
 Ochapowace 71-66
 Ochapowace 71-67
 Ochapowace 71-68
 Ochapowace 71-69
 Ochapowace 71-70
 Ochapowace 71-71
 Ochapowace 71-72
 Ochapowace 71-73
 Ochapowace 71-74
 Ochapowace 71-75
 Ochapowace 71-76
 Ochapowace 71-77
 Ochapowace 71-78
 Ochapowace 71-79
 Ochapowace 71-80
 Ochapowace 71-82
 Ochapowace 71-83
 Ochapowace 71-86
 Ochapowace 71-87
 Ochapowace 71-88
 Ochapowace 71-89
 Ochapowace 71-91
 Ochapowace 71-92
 Ochapowace 71-93
 Ochapowace 71-94
 Ochapowace 71-95
 Ochapowace 71-96
 Ochapowace 71-97
 Ochapowace 71-98
 Ochapowace 71-99
 Ochapowace 71-100
 Ochapowace 71-101
 Ochapowace 71-102
 Ochapowace 71-103
 Ochapowace 71-104
 Ochapowace 71-105
 Ochapowace 71-106
 Ochapowace 71-107
 Ochapowace 71-108
 Ochapowace 71-109
 Ochapowace 71-110
 Ochapowace 71-112
 Ochapowace 71-115
 Ochapowace 71-116
 Ochapowace 71-117
 Ochapowace 71-118
 Ochapowace 71-119
 Ochapowace 71-120
 Ochapowace 71-121
 Ochapowace 71-122
 Ochapowace 71-123
 Ochapowace 71-124
 Ochapowace 71-125
 Ochapowace 71-126
 Ochapowace 71-127
 Ochapowace 71-128
 Ochapowace 71-129
 Ochapowace 71-130
 Ochapowace 71-131
 Ochapowace 71-132
 Treaty Four Reserve Grounds 77, shared with 32 other bands.

References

First Nations in Saskatchewan